Enrico Fumia (born 16 May 1948) is an Italian automobile and product designer. He is widely known for his work with the car design firm Pininfarina, helping to design and package a new sports car version of the Alfa Romeo, which included front-wheel drive and traversely-mounted engines. Today he runs Fumia Design Studio.

Career
1966: Fumia wins a Grifo d'Oro Bertone Design competition at age 18. Also this year he is responsible for a front end design of a Siata Spring
1967: Collaboration with Italian magazines Mark 3 and Autosprint.
1970: Collaboration with Count Mario Revelli di Beaumont's Office.
1976: Graduated Aeronautic Engineer at the Politecnico of Turin with an experimental thesis about vehicle's aerodynamics tested at the Pininfarina Wind Tunnel. Same year hired by Pininfarina - in charge of Styling and Industrial Design, Pre-engineering, Models and Prototyping manufacturing.
1982: Manager at Pininfarina R&D - Models and Prototypes Development.
1988: Manager at Pininfarina R&D - Design and Development.
1989: Deputy General Manager at Pininfarina R&D.
1991: Director of Centro Stile Lancia at Fiat Auto.
1996: Director of Diversified Design at Fiat Auto.
1999: Partnership with A. Sessano at Master Design Intl.
2002: Fumia Design Associati - Design & Engineering Studio.
2009: Fumia Design Studio - Creative Design Studio.

Notable car designs
1966 - Grifo D'Oro Bertone
1966 - Siata Spring (front end)
1977 - Menarini SL (dashboard)
1981 - Audi Quartz concept
1981 - Fiat Coupé Brio concept
1982 - Alfa Romeo 164
1987 - Alfa Romeo GTV and Spider
1988 - Ferrari F90
1992 - Lancia Y
1992 - Lancia Lybra (partially)
1995 - Maserati 3200GT and Spyder - Coupé (Interiors)
2005 - Chery QQme (also known as Chery S16)

Gallery

References

1948 births
Automotive engineers from Turin
Pininfarina people
Living people